The 2000 GlobalCenter Sports Car Championships presented by Honda was the tenth round of the 2000 American Le Mans Series season.  It took place at Laguna Seca Raceway, California, on October 15, 2000.

Official results
Class winners in bold.

Statistics
 Pole Position: Rinaldo Capello - #77 Audi Sport North America - 1:15.028
 Fastest Lap: Allan McNish - #77 Audi Sport North America - 1:16.280
 Distance: 428.604 km
 Average Speed: 154.766 km/h

External links
  
 World Sports Racing Prototypes - Race Results

M
Monterey Sports Car Championships
Monterey Sports Car